Club Baloncesto OAR Ferrol was a professional basketball club based in Ferrol, Spain.

History
OAR Ferrol was founded in 1951, but didn't promote to the top league until 1980. During 13 years played on Primera División or Liga ACB and qualified to play the Korać Cup three seasons.

In 1994, the club was relegated due to financial problems and, two years later, it was dissolved.

Season by season

Notable players
 Fernando Romay
  Anicet Lavodrama
  Lars Hansen
 Chuck Aleksinas
 Linton Townes
 Otis Howard
 Jimmy Oliver

Trophies and awards
Copa Galicia: (5)
1988, 1989, 1990, 1991, 1993

References
Ferrol: Todo un clásico gallego ACB.com

OAR
OAR
Ferrol, Spain
Former Liga ACB teams